Barjala is one of the 60 Legislative Assembly constituencies of Tripura state in India. It is part of West Tripura district and is reserved for candidates belonging to the Scheduled Castes. It is part of Tripura West (Lok Sabha constituency).

Members of Legislative Assembly 
 1972: Basana Chakrabarty, Indian National Congress
 1977: Gouri Bhattacharjee, Communist Party of India (Marxist)
 1983: Gouri Bhattacharjee, Communist Party of India (Marxist)
 1988: Dipak Kumar Roy, Indian National Congress
 1993: Arun Bhowmik, Janata Dal (B)
 1998: Dipak Kumar Roy, Indian National Congress
 2003: Dipak Kumar Roy, Indian National Congress
 2008: Sankar Prasad Datta, Communist Party of India (Marxist)
 2013: Jitendra Sarkar, Indian National Congress
 2016: Jhumu Sarkar, Communist Party of India (Marxist)

Election results

2018 election

2016 by-election

2013 election

See also
List of constituencies of the Tripura Legislative Assembly
West Tripura district

References

West Tripura district
Assembly constituencies of Tripura